The 32nd German Skeleton Championship 1998 was organized on 11 January 1998 in Altenberg.

Men 
 Women

See also
 Skeleton (sport)

External links 
  Resultlist 

Skeleton championships in Germany
1998 in German sport
1998 in skeleton